MagicISO (also referred to as MagicISO Maker) is a CD/DVD image shareware utility that can extract, edit, create and burn disc image files. It offers the possibility of converting between ISO and CUE/BIN and their proprietary Universal Image Format disc image format.

It is able to read and write to disc images without decompressing or moving the files. It can also convert the data from existing CD/DVD-ROMs to disc images. It can also create bootable image files (file extension .bif). MagicISO can mount disc images with the addition of MagicISO Virtual CD/DVD Manager.

The trial version cannot handle disc images larger than 300 MB. MagicISO is currently produced by MagicISO, Inc.

Universal Image Format 
Universal Image Format or UIF is a proprietary disc image format for CDs and DVDs designed for MagicISO. Compared to the widespread simpler image formats like .iso and .bin, UIF adds compression, password-protected encryption, MD5 checksums and multi-session images.

Problems with MagicISO 
MagicISO supports CIF files created by Easy CD Creator, but only data CDs (ISO 9660 compatibles), not audio CDs. MagicISO also installs a context menu through the file C:\MagicISO\misosh64.dll (if installed to default directories) which is not removed with the software when uninstalled, rather, it remains on your system and is not easily removed.

MagicDisc 
MagicDisc, sometimes known as MagicISO Virtual CD/DVD Manager is a freeware virtual drive counterpart to MagicISO. It is a separate download needed to mount discs virtually.  MagicDisc can also decompress UIF images to ISO format.

Unlike MagicISO, MagicDisc does not have support for .daa files that were produced by PowerISO.

See also 
 List of ISO image software

References

External links 
 UIF2ISO - open-source tool to convert MagicISO UIF images into ISO images
 UIF to ISO - free tool to convert UIF images into ISO images

Optical disc authoring
Disk image editors
Disk image emulators
Shareware
Freeware